Urartu Yerevan is an ice hockey team in Yerevan, Armenia. The team participates in the Armenian Hockey League.

Urartu was founded in 2005, and since then they have won all Armenian Hockey League seasons they've participated in.

Season-by-season record

Achievements
Armenian League champion (5): 2006, 2007, 2008, 2009, 2010

References
Urartu Yerevan profile on Hockeyarenas.net

Ice hockey teams in Armenia
2005 establishments in Armenia